The 2003 Hong Kong District Council elections were held on 23 November 2003 for all 18 districts of Hong Kong, 400 members from directly elected constituencies out of total 529 council members. It was the second District Council election after the handover of Hong Kong in 1997.

The election was historically significant as it was the first election came after the controversies over the legislation of the Hong Kong Basic Law Article 23 and the large-scale July 1 protests in mid-2003 against the unpopular Tung Chee-hwa administration. The election saw the devastating defeat of the pro-government pro-Beijing camp.

The pro-Beijing flagship party Democratic Alliance for the Betterment of Hong Kong (DAB) received the largest defeat in the elections, only 62 of the 206 of its candidates were elected. The party's heavyweights, Yeung Yiu-chung, Lau Kong-wah and Ip Kwok-him all lost their seats to the pro-democracy challengers, with Ip lost his longtime base of Kwun Lung to Cyd Ho of The Frontier. Choy So-yuk also faced challenge from Leung Kwok-hung of April Fifth Action, only retained her seat with narrow margin. DAB chairman Tsang Yok-sing resigned for the party's defeat after the election, and subsequently was replaced by Ma Lik. The pro-democracy camp received overall success, with Democratic Party winning the most of 95 seats.

After the election, Chief Executive Tung Chee-hwa appointed 102 pro-government members to the District Councils to dilute the influence of the pro-democrats and retained control of some of the councils.

Overview
Before the elections were held, media had speculated the effect of the controversy over the legislation of the Hong Kong Basic Law Article 23 to the pro-Beijing camp. With the surge of popularity after the 2003 July 1 protests, the pro-democrats managed to present a united platform in the District Council election. More than two hundred candidates form all pro-democracy parties and groups supported the direct election of the Chief Executive by 2007; direct elections of all seats of the Legislative Council by 2008; the initiation of public consultations on political reforms by the government before the end of 2003; and the abolition of all appointed seats to the District Councils after the November 2003 elections.

The pro-democrat candidates challenged the heavyweights of the Democratic Alliance for the Betterment of Hong Kong (DAB), the flagship pro-government party in many constituencies, including the party vice-chairman Ip Kwok-him's Kwun Lung, Choy So-yuk's Kam Ping, Yeung Yiu-chung's Mei Foo South and Lau Kong-wah's Kam To. Lau Kong-wah stood in Kam To, challenging Democratic Party's Shirley Ho Suk-ping. As Lau was the Legislative Councillor for New Territories East, pro-democrats saw Kam To as a crucial target. Icons like Audrey Eu, Alan Leong and Cheung Man-kwong took turns campaigning for Shirley Ho. Standing in the traditional Hokkien community Kam Ping, Choy so-yuk faced the challenged from Leung Kwok-hung of the April Fifth Action, while The Frontier's Cyd Ho stood in Kwun Lung against Ip Kwok-him. Both Ho and Ip were members of the Legislative Council, while Ip chaired the Legco committee on the national security bill. Ho was supported by Article 45 Concern Group's Ronny Tong and Ip was supported by the DAB chairman Tsang Yok-sing.

An unprecedented record of 44 percent, in total of 1.06 millions voters cast their vote in the election. In result, Yeung Yiu-chung, Lau Kong-wah and Ip Kwok-him were all defeated by the pro-democrats while Choy So-yuk retained her seat with narrow margin. The pro-democracy flagship party Democratic Party became the clear winner by winning the most number of 95 seats. Cyd Ho's Civic Act-up which was established after the July 1 protest also captured three seats in the Wan Chai District Council and was able to control the council for the first time with the other independent councillors. Only 62 of the 206 DAB candidates were elected, which became the worst defeat in DAB's history. Tsang Yok-sing took responsibility for the electoral setback and resigned his chairman post. He claimed that the defeat was due to the DAB's unfortunate "Tung loyalist" public image.

Results

General outcome

|-
! style="background-color:#E9E9E9;text-align:center;" colspan=3 |Political Affiliation
! style="background-color:#E9E9E9;text-align:right;" |Popular vote
! style="background-color:#E9E9E9;text-align:right;" |%
! style="background-color:#E9E9E9;text-align:right;" |%±
! style="background-color:#E9E9E9;text-align:right;" |Standing
! style="background-color:#E9E9E9;text-align:right;" |Elected
! style="background-color:#E9E9E9;text-align:right;" |±
|-
| style="background-color:pink;border-bottom-style:hidden;" rowspan="10" |
| width=1px style="background-color: " |
| style="text-align:left;" |Democratic Alliance for the Betterment of Hong Kong 
| 241,202 || 22.94 || 0.59 || 200 || 62 || 21
|-
| width=1px style="background-color: " |
| style="text-align:left;" |Civil Force
|  25,720 || 2.45 || 0.02 || 22 || 17 || 3
|-
| width=1px style="background-color: " |
| style="text-align:left;" |Liberal Party 
| 29,108 || 2.77 || 0.65 || 27 || 14 || 1
|-
| width=1px style="background-color: " |
| style="text-align:left;" |Hong Kong Progressive Alliance 
| 29,091 || 2.77 || 0.05 || 23 || 13 || 5
|-
|style="background-color: #E50500"|
| style="text-align:left;" | Wan Chai Community Union
|  1,189 || 0.11 || - || 1 || 1 || -
|-
| width=1px style="background-color: " |
| style="text-align:left;" |Hong Kong Federation of Trade Unions 
| 2,766 || 0.26 || 0.13 ||| 3 || 0 || -
|-
|style="background-color: #FF8C00"|
| style="text-align:left;" | New Youth Forum
|  1,314 ||0.12 || - || 2 || 0 || -
|-
|style="background-color: "|
| style="text-align:left;" | New Century Forum
|  833 || 0.08 || - || 1 || 0 || -
|-
|style="background-color: "|
| style="text-align:left;" | Federation of Hong Kong and Kowloon Labour Unions
| - || - || - || 1 || 1 || -
|-
| width=1px style="background-color: " |
| style="text-align:left;" | Independent and others
|  156,827  || 14.92 || - || 136 || 92 || 6
|-
|- style="background-color:Pink"
| colspan=3 style="text-align:left;" | Total for pro-Beijing camp ||  489,889  || 46.48 || 0.97 || 417||201 || 28
|-
| style="background-color:lightgreen;border-bottom-style:hidden;" rowspan="13"|
| width=1px style="background-color: " |
| style="text-align:left;" |Democratic Party 
|223,675 || 21.27 || 3.57 || 120 || 95 || 17
|-
| width=1px style="background-color: " |
| style="text-align:left;" |Hong Kong Association for Democracy and People's Livelihood 
| 53,264 || 5.07 || 0.36 || 37 || 25 || 4
|-
|style="background-color: "|
| style="text-align:left;" |Frontier
| 25,349 || 2.41 || 1.25 || 14 || 6 || 1
|-
| width=1px style="background-color: " |
| style="text-align:left;" |Neighbourhood and Worker's Service Centre 
| 14,146 || 1.35 || 0.94 || 5 || 4 || 1
|-
| width=1px style="background-color: " |
| style="text-align:left;" |Yuen Long Tin Shui Wai Democratic Alliance 
|   8,418 || 0.80 || - || 6 || 4 || 2
|-
| width=1px style="background-color: " |
| style="text-align:left;" |Civic Act-up 
|  5,170 || 0.49 || - || 5 || 3 || 3
|-
| width=1px style="background-color: " |
| style="text-align:left;" |Central and Western Democratic Power 
| 5,748 || 0.55|| - || 4 || 2 || -
|-
| width=1px style="background-color: " |
| style="text-align:left;" |Hong Kong Confederation of Trade Unions 
|  4,032 || 0.38 || - || 3 || 2 || 2
|-
|style="background-color: #1c41e0"|
| style="text-align:left;" | Yuen Long Democratic Alliance
|   1,489 || 0.14 || - || 1 || 1 || -
|-
| width=1px style="background-color: #FF7312" |
| style="text-align:left;" |7.1 People Pile 
|  2,888 || 0.27 || - || 3 || 0|| -
|-
| width=1px style="background-color: " |
| style="text-align:left;" |April Fifth Action 
|  1,149 || 0.11 || - || 1 || 0 || -
|-
| width=1px style="background-color: " |
| style="text-align:left;" |Citizens Party 
| 361 || 0.03 || 0.22 || 1 || 0 || 1
|-
| width=1px style="background-color: " |
| style="text-align:left;" | Independent democrats
|  130,453   || 12.41 || - || 87 || 56 || 8
|- style="background-color:LightGreen"
| colspan=3 style="text-align:left;" | Total for pro-democracy camp ||  477,596    ||  45.54 || 10.29 || 288 || 198 || 38
|-
|- style="background-color:#DDDDDD;"
| colspan=3 style="text-align:left;" |Independent and others
| 83,939 || 7.98 || - || 132 || 1 || -
|-
|style="text-align:left;background-color:#E9E9E9" colspan="3"|Total (turnout 44.10%)
|width="75" style="text-align:right;background-color:#E9E9E9"| 1,051,424 
|width="30" style="text-align:right;background-color:#E9E9E9"|100.0
|style="text-align:right;background-color:#E9E9E9"|-
|style="text-align:right;background-color:#E9E9E9"|837
|style="text-align:right;background-color:#E9E9E9"|400
|style="text-align:right;background-color:#E9E9E9"|10
|}

Results by district

Vote summary

Seat summary

Aftermath
In December 2003 after the elections, Tung appointed 21 political party appointees to the District Councils to dilute the influence of the pro-democrats as follows:
 8 members of the Liberal Party
 6 members of the DAB
 6 members from the Progressive Alliance
 1 from the New Century Forum

Professor of politics and sociology at Lingnan University, Dr. Li Pang-kwong said "As in the past, most of the appointees were pro-government or persons without a clear political stance... ensur[ing] that no district council is in the hands of the democrats."

A spokesman for the democrats said the appointees "will have an unfair advantage in that they are getting financial support from the government which will help them run for office in future elections."

References

 
2003 elections in Asia
2003 elections in China
2003 in Hong Kong
2003
November 2003 events in China